Niki Jackson (born August 25, 1995) is an American soccer player who plays as a forward for San Diego Loyal in the USL Championship. He grew up in Collierville, Tennessee and Scottsdale, Arizona before attending Cactus Shadows High School and Grand Canyon University.

Career

Grand Canyon University
Jackson played four years of college soccer at Grand Canyon University between 2014 and 2017. He was coached his first year by Petar Draksin at GCU and the following three seasons by Schellas Hyndman. During his time with the Antelopes, Jackson scored 41 goals and tallied nine assists in 69 appearances. He was the program's second ever MLS SuperDraft pick after teammate Amir Šašivarević went one round earlier in the same draft.

Colorado Rapids
On January 21, 2018, Jackson was selected 73rd overall in the 2018 MLS SuperDraft by Colorado Rapids. He signed with the club on February 20, 2018. He made his professional debut on February 28, 2018 as a 66th-minute substitute during a CONCACAF Champions League game against Toronto FC. Jackson came on as a sub for his MLS debut and scored his first career goal against New England Revolution. On April 21, 2018, Jackson was loaned to United Soccer League side Colorado Springs Switchbacks FC.

On April 12, 2019, Jackson was loaned to USL side Charlotte Independence.

Following their 2020 season, Colorado opted to decline their contract option on Jackson.

San Diego Loyal
On February 11, 2021, Jackson signed with USL Championship side San Diego Loyal.

On August 6, 2021, Jackson moved on loan to USL League One side South Georgia Tormenta for the remainder of the season.

References

External links
 
 

Living people
1995 births
African-American soccer players
American soccer players
Soccer players from Mississippi
Sportspeople from Vicksburg, Mississippi
Association football forwards
Grand Canyon Antelopes men's soccer players
Colorado Rapids draft picks
Colorado Rapids players
Colorado Springs Switchbacks FC players
San Diego Loyal SC players
Charlotte Independence players
Major League Soccer players
USL Championship players
Tormenta FC players
21st-century African-American sportspeople
USL League One players